SFB Games Limited is a British video game developer based in London. The studio was established in 2002 by brothers Tom and Adam Vian, who, as "The Super Flash Bros.", produced browser games and animations in Adobe Flash for websites such as Newgrounds and Armor Games. At SFB Games, Tom acts as technical director, while Adam occupies the role of creative director.

History 
On 2 September 2002, brothers Tom and Adam Vian, at the time aged 17 and 14, respectively, established a Newgrounds account under the name The Super Flash Bros., and uploaded their first Adobe Flash movie, Metal Gear Mayhem, the same day. The duo went on hiatus when Tom started attending university. After reforming, they entered into a partnership with Armor Games, whereby Armor Games would fund all future Flash games created by the two brothers. In total, they developed 34 games for Armor Games. On 16 May 2012, the studio incorporated as SFB Games Limited under the United Kingdom company law, the "SFB" being an abbreviation of the former name.

Games developed

References

External links 
 

Privately held companies based in London
Video game companies of the United Kingdom
Video game companies established in 2002
British companies established in 2002
Video game development companies
2002 establishments in England